Mistborn: The Final Empire, also known simply as Mistborn or The Final Empire, is a fantasy novel written by American author Brandon Sanderson. It was published on July 17, 2006, by Tor Books and is the first novel in the Mistborn trilogy, followed by The Well of Ascension in 2007 and The Hero of Ages in 2008.

Synopsis

Setting
Mistborn: The Final Empire is set on the dystopian world of Scadrial, where ash constantly falls from the sky, all plants are brown, and supernatural mists cloak the landscape every night. One thousand years before the start of the novel, the prophesied Hero of Ages ascended to godhood at the Well of Ascension in order to repel the Deepness, a terror threatening the world whose true nature has since been lost to time. Though the Deepness was successfully repelled and mankind saved, the world was changed into its current form by the Hero, who took the title "Lord Ruler" and has ruled over the Final Empire for a thousand years as an immortal tyrant and god. Under his rule, society is stratified into the nobility, believed to be the descendants of the friends and allies who helped him achieve godhood, and the brutally oppressed peasantry descended from those who opposed him, known as skaa.

Magic is central to the Mistborn world. The most widely known discipline of magic is called Allomancy, which allows users to gain supernatural abilities by swallowing and "burning" specific metals. Allomantic potential is a genetic trait concentrated in the nobility, though skaa Allomancers also exist due to crossbreeding between the nobility and the skaa. Normal Allomancers have access to one Allomantic power, but an incredibly rare subset of Allomancers, called Mistborn, have access to every Allomantic power.

Plot summary
Three years prior to the start of the novel, a half-skaa thief named Kelsier discovered that he was Mistborn and escapes the Pits of Hathsin, a brutal prison camp of the Lord Ruler. He returned to Luthadel, the capital city of the Final Empire, where he rounded up his old thieving crew for a new job: to overthrow the Final Empire by stealing its treasury and collapsing its economy.

At the beginning of the novel, Vin, a wary and abused street urchin, is recruited by Kelsier's crew after Kelsier is notified by his brother, Marsh, that she is a Mistborn. Vin is trained by Kelsier's crew to develop her Allomantic powers, which include burning pewter to strengthen the body, burning tin to enhance the senses, and burning steel and iron to gain a limited form of telekinesis over metal. She is also given the duty of spying on the nobility by attending opulent balls in Luthadel (the capital and center of the final empire), where she poses as Valette Renoux, niece to Lord Renoux, a nobleman working with Kelsier's crew. During these balls, she meets and falls in love with Elend Venture, heir to House Venture, the most powerful of the Luthadel noble houses. Elend flouts the rules of nobility culture and secretly plans to build a better society with his noble friends when they ascend to their respective house titles.

Kelsier hopes to conquer the city by destabilizing it with a house war between the nobility and then invading with a skaa army. Once in control, he hopes to overthrow the Final Empire by stealing the Lord Ruler's hoard of atium, a precious metal which is the cornerstone of the Final Empire's economy. The crew succeeds in starting a house war by assassinating several powerful nobles and recruiting about seven thousand soldiers to join their cause. However, about three quarters of the soldiers are slaughtered when they foolishly attack an unimportant Final Empire garrison with the hopes of divine protection from Kelsier, who has spread rumors of his "supernatural" powers. The remaining soldiers are smuggled into Luthadel by Kelsier, who intends to continue the plan. Unfortunately, Marsh is discovered and seemingly killed, and Lord Renoux and his estate are seized and he is brought to be executed by the Canton of Inquisition, the police arm of the Final Empire. This Canton is made up of Steel Inquisitors, seemingly indestructible Allomancers with steel spikes driven through their eyes. Though Kelsier's crew manage to free most of Renoux's group and kill an Inquisitor, Kelsier is killed by the Lord Ruler himself in a dramatic confrontation in Luthadel's city square. Though these events appear to leave Kelsier's plan in shambles, it is revealed that his real plan was to become a martyred symbol of hope for Luthadel's superstitious skaa population. The skaa population reacts to his death by rising up and overthrowing the city with the help of Kelsier's army.

Before his death, Kelsier had attempted to unlock the potential of the "Eleventh Metal" that he had acquired, which was rumored to be the Lord Ruler's weakness. He was unable to do so before his death, and left it to Vin to finish the job. With the Eleventh Metal, Vin goes to the imperial palace to kill the Lord Ruler. She is captured by the Canton of Inquisition and left in a cell to be tortured, but Sazed, her faithful servant, comes to her rescue. Using a magical discipline called Feruchemy, he helps Vin escape and recover her possessions. Marsh is revealed to be alive, having actually been made into a Steel Inquisitor; he betrays his fellow Inquisitors and slays them. Vin fights the Lord Ruler, who is revealed to be both an incredibly powerful Allomancer and a Feruchemist, the combination of which grants him incredible healing powers and eternal youth. Vin is almost destroyed by the Lord Ruler, but with hints from the Eleventh Metal and the unexpected magical aid of the mists, she manages to separate the Lord Ruler from his Feruchemical bracelets that provide him with constant youth, causing him to age rapidly. Vin uses a spear to kill the Lord Ruler, who with his last words ominously warns her of a great doom. The Final Empire collapses, though Elend is able to avoid total societal collapse by uniting Luthadel under a new system of democratic government.

Characters
 Vin: A teenage street urchin who discovers that she is a Mistborn and joins Kelsier's crew. She is wary and not trusting, having lived a harsh life on the streets. She is haunted by the memory of her brother Reen, who frequently beat her and taught her brutal lessons of survival. 
 Kelsier: A famous thief who made a fortune stealing from the nobility. He and his wife were eventually caught and sent to the Pits of Hathsin, a notorious prison camp from which no one has ever returned. There, Kelsier witnessed his wife's death, which awakened his Mistborn powers and allowed him to escape. He inherits his wife's dream of overthrowing the Final Empire, and now leads a rebellion to accomplish this goal. 
 Lord Ruler: The immortal ruler and self-proclaimed god of the Final Empire, who is said to have saved mankind a thousand years ago and remade the world into its current form.
 Sazed: A Terrisman Keeper who can use the ancient art of Feruchemy, which allows him to store attributes such as physical strength, time, and even knowledge in metal. He hopes to one day share knowledge of the past (especially regarding various religions that once existed) with all people when the Final Empire has been overthrown.
 Elend Venture: A nobleman and the heir to House Venture, the most powerful house in Luthadel. He is one of the few nobles who wishes for societal reform in the Final Empire. He often breaks from traditional noble cultural standards, and quickly grows close to Vin as she infiltrates high society posing as Valette Renoux.
 Breeze (Edgard Ladrian): A member of Kelsier's crew and a Soother – someone who can soothe and manipulate people's emotions by burning brass. He enjoys using his abilities to manipulate people into fetching him wine. His main task is recruiting skaa for Kelsier's army.
 Hammond: One of Kelsier's crewmembers, also known as Ham. He is a Thug, or Pewterarm, who burns pewter to enhance his physical abilities. He likes to hold philosophical debates, especially with Breeze, unlike a stereotypical Pewterarm. His main task is training “an army” at the hidden caves for Kelsier's plan.
 Dockson: One of Kelsier's crewmembers, and Kelsier's oldest friend. Unlike the others, he does not have any Allomantic powers. Instead he is responsible for organizing the crew and taking care of contacting other crews for help.
 Lestibournes or Spook: A member of Kelsier's crew and Clubs' nephew. The name "Spook" is given to him by Kelsier after he finds Lestibournes too difficult to pronounce. He is a Tineye (a Misting who burns tin to enhance their senses) and the youngest member of the crew. He often speaks in a type of street-slang the others find difficult to understand.
 Clubs: A member of Kelsier's crew and Spooks’ uncle. Clubs is a carpenter and a Smoker (a Misting who burns copper to hide the use of Allomancy from other Allomancers). He owns a shop that serves as a secret base of operations for Kelsier and his crew. He is also called Master Cladent.
 Marsh: Kelsier's estranged brother, a former member of the skaa rebellion who has lost hope of overthrowing the Final Empire. He is a Seeker, an Allomancer who can detect other Allomancers. Kelsier encourages Marsh to rejoin the rebellion and aid them by infiltrating the Canton of Inquisition. 
 Lord Renoux: A nobleman who supports the plot to overthrow the Empire. Kelsier subtly implies that he may be an imposter. 
 Yeden: a leader of the skaa rebellion who seeks Kelsier's aid in acquiring an army.

Development
Sanderson began work on the novel while trying to get his earlier novel Elantris published. After writing two early iterations, he shifted his focus to his Stormlight Archive series but chose to delay its publication in favor of completing the Mistborn series because he thought it would serve as a better follow-up to Elantris.

Reception
Upon publication, Mistborn: The Final Empire was nominated for the Romantic Times Reviewers' Choice Best Book Award for an Epic Fantasy Novel.

A review in The Washington Post said "Sanderson's characters aren't particularly well-developed, and the allomancy sometimes feels a little like a video game trick (press X-Y-X-X to burn steel!). But he has created a fascinating world here, one that deserves a sequel." Forbes magazine praised all of the books in the Mistborn series collectively: "The narrative is crafted with such bloody precision, it's nearly impossible to put the books down."

Adaptations

Film
In January 2010, Brandon Sanderson optioned the rights to the Mistborn books to Paloppa Pictures, LLC. In Q1 of 2014, Paloppa Pictures' option ran out. In October 2016, the rights to the entire Cosmere universe, including the Mistborn series, were licensed by DMG Entertainment. On January 27, 2017, Deadline Hollywood reported that DMG signed F. Scott Frazier as the screenwriter for an adaptation of Mistborn: The Final Empire.

Audiobook
An audiobook version was released in March 2011 by Macmillan Audio, read by Michael Kramer. A three-part GraphicAudio version of The Final Empire was released on February 1, 2014.

References

External links
 Mistborn: The Final Empire (official site)
 Mistborn at Macmillan
 
 
 Mistborn. Mormon Literature & Creative Arts Database.

2006 American novels
Mistborn novels
Novels set on fictional planets
Tor Books books